Three on a Couch is a 1966 American comedy film directed by Jerry Lewis and starring Jerry Lewis and Janet Leigh.

Plot
Christopher Pride wants to marry his girlfriend, Dr. Elizabeth Acord. However, she is too involved with her patients and she doesn't think that she would be able to leave them to live in Paris for a year. Pride decides to solve her patients' problems after finding out that most of them are merely despondent after having relationships go bad. Therefore, he decides to "date" these women, without Acord's knowledge, and give them back their self-esteem so that they will be less dependent on their doctor.

Pride adopts a separate persona for each woman, targeted to be their ideal partner. Ringo Raintree the millionaire cowboy woos a Anna Jacque, a French patient. For southern belle Mary Lou Mauve he becomes Rutherford the zoologist (and Ruther's twin sister, Heather) and for passionate athlete Susan he becomes Warren, also an athlete.

The film comes to a climax when all the women, including the psychiatrist, assemble at a party with Pride present. He quickly switches from one character to the next depending on which woman is present.

Cast
 Jerry Lewis as Christopher Pride / Warren / Ringo / Rutherford / Heather
 Janet Leigh as Dr.Elizabeth Acord
 Mary Ann Mobley as Susan Manning 
 Gila Golan as Anna Jacque
 Leslie Parrish as Mary Lou Mauve
 James Best as Dr. Ben Mizer
 Kathleen Freeman as Murphy
 Jesslyn Fax as Rich Lady
 Buddy Lester as The Drunk
 Renie Riano as Old Woman
 Renzo Cesana as The Ambassandor
 Fritz Feld as The Attache

Production
This was the first film that Lewis made for Columbia after ending a 17-year long association with Paramount Pictures. This is also the first film that Lewis directed in which he did not receive a screenwriting credit. Three on a Couch was listed in the 1978 book The Fifty Worst Films of All Time. It was filmed from September 13 - December 1, 1965, it was released on July 7, 1966.

Comedians Buddy Lester and Fritz Feld have cameos. Janet Leigh previously co-starred with Lewis and Dean Martin in Living It Up (1954).

Reception
The film was included in the 1978 book, The Fifty Worst Films of All Time (and How They Got That Way), by Harry Medved, Randy Dreyfuss, and Michael Medved.

Home media
Three on a Couch was released on DVD in a Jerry Lewis Triple Feature collection with Don't Raise the Bridge, Lower the River, and Hook, Line & Sinker on January 16, 2018 and own its own on December 8, 2019.

See also
List of American films of 1966

References

External links 
 
 

1966 films
1966 romantic comedy films
American romantic comedy films
American screwball comedy films
1960s English-language films
Columbia Pictures films
Films directed by Jerry Lewis
Films produced by Jerry Lewis
1960s American films